Leo Lermond (April 15, 1906 – July 4, 1986) was an American long-distance runner. He competed in the men's 5000 metres at the 1928 Summer Olympics.

References

1906 births
1986 deaths
Athletes (track and field) at the 1928 Summer Olympics
American male long-distance runners
Olympic track and field athletes of the United States
Place of birth missing